Epip, also known as Epiphi (Epiphí) and Abib, is the eleventh month of the ancient Egyptian and Coptic calendars. It lasts between July 8 and August 6 of the Gregorian calendar. The month of Epip is also the third month of the Season of Shemu (Harvest) in ancient Egypt, where the Egyptians harvest their crops throughout the land.

Coptic Synaxarium of the month of Epip

References

Citations

Bibliography
 Synaxarium of the month of Abib

Months of the Coptic calendar
Egyptian calendar